Chionodes luctuella is a moth of the family Gelechiidae. It is found in Norway, Sweden, Finland, Denmark, Germany, Austria, Switzerland, Italy, the Czech Republic, Slovakia, Poland, Hungary, Romania, Estonia, Latvia, Ukraine and Russia.

The wingspan is 13–15 mm. Adults have been recorded on wing from June to August.

The larvae feed on Picea abies.

References

Moths described in 1793
Chionodes
Moths of Europe
Taxa named by Jacob Hübner